Ivana Střondalová (born 22 October 1970) is a former ice dancer who competed for Czechoslovakia. With partner Milan Brzý, she placed in the top ten at the 1990 European Championships and won the bronze medal at the 1991 Winter Universiade. She studied at the Silesian University, obtaining a Master's degree in January 2001.

Competitive highlights 
(with Brzý)

References 

1970 births
Czechoslovak female ice dancers
Universiade medalists in figure skating
Living people
Universiade bronze medalists for Czechoslovakia
Competitors at the 1991 Winter Universiade